Titovka may refer to:
Titovka (river), a river in Murmansk Oblast, Russia
Titovka (rural locality), name of several rural localities in Russia
Titovka (cap), a Yugoslav side cap